Way Out  is a 1961 American horror, fantasy, and science fiction television anthology series hosted by writer Roald Dahl. The macabre black-and-white 25-minute shows were introduced by Dahl, his face projected in a disconcerting hall of mirrors effect, dryly delivering a brief introductory monologue, expounding on such unusual subjects as undertakers or frogs or murdering a romantic rival with ground tiger's whiskers.

Origin

The taped series began as CBS replacement for a Jackie Gleason talk show that network executives were about to cancel. Producer David Susskind contacted Dahl to help mount a show quickly. The series was paired by the network with the similar The Twilight Zone for Friday evening broadcasts, running from March through July 1961 at 9:30 pm Eastern time. The show's primary sponsor was Liggett & Myers (L&M cigarettes). Writers included Larry Cohen and Sumner Locke Elliott.

The only adaptation from one of Dahl's own short stories was the premiere episode, "William and Mary", a tale of a wife's posthumous revenge on her husband's disembodied brain kept alive in a bowl. In "Dissolve to Black", an actress (Kathleen Widdoes) cast as a murder victim at a television studio goes through a rehearsal, but the drama merges with reality as she finds herself trapped on the show's near-deserted set. Other dramas offered startling imagery: a snake slithering up a carpeted staircase inside a suburban home, a headless woman strapped to an electric chair with a light bulb in place of her head ("Side Show"), and half of a man's face erased ("Soft Focus"). Roald Dahl's short story, "Skin," was purchased alongside "William and Mary," but the network decided the story was too gory for telecast, especially after they asked Susskind to not film the brain being kept alive in the jar and only suggest the brain off camera. 

Actors on the series included Martin Balsam, Michael Conrad, Mildred Dunnock, Kathleen Widdoes, Murray Hamilton, Martin Huston, Henry Jones, Mark Lenard, Kevin McCarthy, John McGiver, Barry Morse, Richard Thomas, Doris Roberts, and Fritz Weaver.

Roald Dahl was initially hired to host the series for three consecutive episodes at a salary of $650 per episode. CBS contracted David Susskind to produce a total of 26 half-hour episodes. Roald Dahl informed Susskind that he only wanted to host the first three episodes to make enough money to pay for his son's medical bills. But Dahl ultimately loved the assignment and optioned to remain as host beyond the first three. Initial proposals was to have Dahl sitting on a rock, answering the telephone, filmed on location at Central Park. But the cold January weather and the costs involved resulted in the decision to film Dahl's intros in a studio. 

Critical notices at the time were extremely good, especially for Dahl's wry commentaries, suffused with gallows humor. The program was sponsored by Liggett and Myers, makers of cigarettes. The sponsor insisted characters on the programs smoked the product to ensure product placement. In the episode "The Sisters," the entire cast not only smoked cigarettes but also emptied ash trays during the telecast. Dahl himself smoked a cigarette during his introductory remarks.  When network affiliates were receiving complaints from concerned parents about the stories giving their children nightmares, stations (beginning with episode 11) decided to start dropping the program in favor of a 16mm syndicated stock program instead. When a network station in Philadelphia previewed a closed circuit telecast and later agreed the program should not air over their station, news of this spread across syndicated newspaper columns. Ultimately, the sponsor paid less per telecast with less network coverage, which resulted in the decision of the advertising agency (who represented the sponsor) to cancel the program after 14 telecasts. 

The show was one of the last weekly dramatic television series produced in Manhattan. Only five episodes have ever turned up on [bootleg] videocassettes and DVDs; as of October 2016, however, 10 episodes were posted on YouTube. The entire run is available for viewing at the Paley Center for Media in New York City and Los Angeles. The episodes are owned by Susskind's estate.

Dahl later hosted an anthology series called Tales of the Unexpected on British television beginning in 1979.

In 1986, Filmfax Magazine published a two-part article by Gary Joseph and Martin H. Friedenthal documenting the history of the 'WAY OUT television program, along with an episode guide. The authors reviewed the 14 episodes at the Museum of Television and Radio. In 2019, OTR Publishing released a book documenting the history of the television program, after reviewing thousands of archival documents from the production files of David Susskind and CBS, even reporting salary costs for Roald Dahl and the television cast, reprints of plot summaries for episodes that never went into production, and reprints of certain archival documents related to the television program.

Episodes 
Source:

Sources
Battaglio, Stephen (2010). David Susskind: A Televised Life, pp. 89–92. St. Martin's Press.

References

External links
Way Out at RoaldDahlFans.com

 
Way Out at CVTA with episode list

1960s American anthology television series
1961 American television series debuts
1961 American television series endings
American fantasy television series
American horror fiction television series
1960s American science fiction television series
Black-and-white American television shows
CBS original programming
Television series by CBS Studios
Television series by Warner Bros. Television Studios
Television shows set in New York City
Television series by Talent Associates
Science fiction anthology television series